Spencer Elliott Horwitz (born November 14, 1997) is an American professional baseball first baseman in the Toronto Blue Jays organization. He is ranked 13th on Major League Baseball's 2022 Top 30 Blue Jays prospects list. Horwitz will play for Team Israel in the 2023 World Baseball Classic in Miami, in March 2023.

Early life and amateur career
Horwitz is the son of David and Laura Horwitz, and has a brother, Ben. He was born in Timonium, Maryland. He attended St. Paul's School for Boys in Brooklandville, Maryland. Playing baseball for the school, primarily at catcher, he was a 2016 Maryland Interscholastic Athletic Association (MIAA) First Team selection, and twice MIAA All-Conference, as in hockey he played as a defenseman and led the high school to two state championships.

Horwitz then played college baseball at Radford University, playing 161 games at first base and 6 games in left field. In 2017 as a freshman, Horwitz batted .311/.384/.481, and was named Big South Conference Second Team, and a Collegiate Baseball Freshman All American. In 2018, he batted .288/.386/.443 in 219 at bats, had 43 RBIs (7th in the Conference) and 34 walks (9th; the same as his number of strikeouts), and was again named Big South Conference Second Team. After the 2018 season, he played collegiate summer baseball with the Bourne Braves of the Cape Cod Baseball League. In 2019 he batted .268/.392/.465 in 213 at bats, led the league with 49 walks (against only 29 strikeouts) and 7 sacrifice flies, and had 49 runs (6th) and 10 home runs (7th), and was named Big South Conference Honorable Mention.

Professional career
The Toronto Blue Jays selected Horwitz in the 24th round of the 2019 Major League Baseball draft. He signed for a $100,000 signing bonus.

Horwitz spent his first professional season in 2019 with the Rookie League Bluefield Blue Jays and Class A- Vancouver Canadians. He batted a combined .307/.368/.440, as in 248 at bats he had 4 home runs, 52 RBIs, stole 5 bases without being caught, and walked 24 times (while striking out 30 times). He played 26 games at first base, 18 games in left field, and two games at second base. With Bluefield, he batted .330 (6th in the Appalachian League), with 18 doubles (3rd), 49 RBIs (3rd), and 3 sacrifice flies (10th). He was named a 2019 Appalachian League All Star. Horwitz did not play for a team in 2020 due to the Minor League Baseball season being cancelled because of the Covid-19 pandemic.

Horwitz returned in 2021 to play for the now Class A+ Vancouver and for the Class AA New Hampshire Fisher Cats. Horwitz batted a combined .294/.400/.462, as in 405 at bats he had 12 home runs and 66 RBIs, and 70 walks (versus 68 strikeouts). He played 85 games at first base, five games in left field, and one game at second base.  With Vancouver, he led the High-A West with 28 doubles and 70 walks (to only 66 strikeouts), and had a .401 on base percentage (9th) with 65 runs (6th), 62 RBIs (5th), and 5 sacrifice flies (3rd). He had a 28-game hitting streak, breaking a 60-year-old Northwest League/High A-West League record. He was named the Northwest League’s 2021 Top MLB Prospect, and a post-season All Star.

After the season, Horwitz played for the Mesa Solar Sox in the Arizona Fall League, where he batted .375 (6th in the league)/.460(9th)/.484 in 64 at bats, with 4 stolen bases (9th in the league) without being caught, as he played 12 games at first base and two games in left field. He was named an Arizona Fall League Rising Star. MLB.com named him Toronto's #30 prospect.

Horwitz started 2022 with New Hampshire, and was named Eastern League Player of the Week on June 13. In July, as Horwitz was among the Eastern League leaders batting .297(4th)/.413/.517 in 232 at bats, with 46 runs (4th), 19 doubles (4th), and 43 walks (5th), he was promoted to the Class AAA Buffalo Bisons. In 2022, between the two teams he batted .275/.391/.452 in 403 at bats with 77 runs, 12 home runs, and 51 RBIs. 

Horwitz was added to the 40-man roster following the 2022 season. Horwitz was optioned to Triple-A Buffalo to begin the 2023 season.

International career
In 2023, Horwitz was selected to the Israeli national baseball team roster for the 2023 World Baseball Classic. He will be playing for Team Israel manager and former All-Star Ian Kinsler, and alongside All-Star outfielder Joc Pederson and starting pitcher Dean Kremer, among others.

References

External links

Living people
Bourne Braves players
Minor league baseball players
2023 World Baseball Classic players